The term Unnamed Prince of Serbia ( / neimenovani srpski arhont), or the Unknown Prince ( / nepoznati knez), refers to the Serbian prince from the first half of the 7th century, who according to the De Administrando Imperio (10th century CE) supposedly led his people from their original homeland in White Serbia, to settle in the Balkans during the reign of Byzantine Emperor Heraclius (610–641), as mentioned in Emperor Constantine VII's work De Administrando Imperio (written in 950s). The work does not record his name, but states that he was the progenitor of the first Serbian dynasty (known in historiography as the Vlastimirović dynasty), and that he died before the arrival of the Bulgars (680), succeeded by his son, and then grandson.

De Administrando Imperio
{{cquote|
The Serbs are descended from the unbaptized Serbs, also called 'white', who live beyond Turkey in a place called by them Boïki, where their neighbour is Francia, as is also Great Croatia, the unbaptized, also called 'white': in this place, then, these Serbs also originally dwelt. But when two brothers succeeded their father in the rule of Serbia, one of them, taking a moiety of the folk, claimed the protection of Heraclius, the emperor of the Romans, and the same emperor Heraclius received him and gave him a place in the province of Thessalonica to settle in, namely Servia, which from that time has acquired this denomination.
Now, after some time these same Serbs decided to depart to their own homes, and the emperor sent them off. But when they had crossed the river Danube, they changed their minds and sent a request to the emperor Heraclius, through the military governor then governing Belgrade, that he would grant them other land to settle in.
And since what is now Serbia and Pagania and the so-called country of the Zachlumi and Trebounia and the country of the Kanalites were under the dominion of the emperor of the Romans, and since these countries had been made desolate by the Avars (for they had expelled from those parts the Romans who now live in Dalmatia and Dyrrachium), therefore the emperor settled these same Serbs in these countries, and they were subject to the emperor of the Romans; and the emperor brought elders from Rome and baptized them (632) and taught them fairly to perform the works of piety and expounded to them the faith of the Christians.
And since Bulgaria was beneath the dominion of the Romans ... when, therefore, that same Serbian prince died who had claimed the emperor's protection, his son ruled in succession, and thereafter his grandson, and in like manner the succeeding princes from his family."}}

Studies
According to the accounts in DAI the first Christianization of the Serbs should be dated to 632–638; this could be interpreted at first glance as Porphyrogenitus' invention, or might have actually taken place, encompassing a limited group of chiefs and then very poorly received by the wider layers of the tribe. In early historical assessment like that of German historian Ludwig Albrecht Gebhardi (1735–1802), the Serb archon was a son of Dervan, who was the Duke (dux) of the Surbi, east of the Saale. This theory was supported by Miloš Milojević (1872), while Francis Dvornik (1962) and Relja Novaković (1977) argued the possibility that they were brothers or other relatives.

In contemporary historiography and archaeology, the narratives of De Administrando Imperio have been reassessed as they contain anachronisms and factual mistakes. The account in DAI about the Serbs mentions that they requested from the Byzantine commander of present-day Belgrade to settle in the theme of Thessalonica, which was formed ca. 150 years after the reign of Heraclius which was in the 7th century. For the purposes of its narrative, the DAI formulates a mistaken etymology of the Serbian ethnonym which it derives from Latin servi (serfs).

As the Byzantine Empire sought to establish its hegemony towards the Serbs, the narrative of the DAI sought to establish a historical hegemony over the Serbs by claiming that their arrival, settlement and conversion to Christianity was the direct result of the Byzantine interference in the centuries which preceded the writing of DAI''. D. Dzino (2010) considers that the story of the migration from White Serbia after the invitation of Heraclius as a means of explanation of the settlement of the Serbs is a form of rationalization of the social and cultural change which the Balkans had undergone via the misinterpretation of historical events placed in late antiquity.

See also

 List of Serbian monarchs
 Anonym

Notes

References

Sources

 
 

 
 

  
 
 
 
 

7th-century Serbian monarchs
7th-century rulers in Europe
7th-century Slavs
Byzantine people of Slavic descent
Vlastimirović dynasty
Medieval Serbia
History of the Serbs
Legendary monarchs
Founding monarchs
Year of birth unknown
Unidentified people